Fenart (also Romanized as Fenārt; also known as Penārt and Pīnārt) is a village in Jey Rural District, in the Central District of Isfahan County, Isfahan Province, Iran. At the 2006 census, its population was 2,023, in 503 families.

References 

Populated places in Isfahan County